Ngadas is a village in Poncokusumo District, Malang Regency in East Java Province. Its population is 1791.

Climate
Ngadas has a subtropical highland climate (Cwb). It has moderate to little rainfall from May to October and heavy to very heavy rainfall from November to April.

References

East Java
Villages in Indonesia